As Time Goes By is a British romantic sitcom which aired on BBC One from 12 January 1992 to 14 December 2005, running for nine series and two specials. It has made it into the top 30 of Britain's Best Sitcom.

Starring Judi Dench and Geoffrey Palmer, it follows the relationship between two former lovers who meet unexpectedly after not having been in contact for 38 years.

The programme's original working title had been Winter with Flowers but was changed during its first day of filming due to the cast's protestations. The new title was taken from the 1931 Herman Hupfeld song "As Time Goes By", and the recorded version by Joe Fagin was used as the title music.

The show was created by Colin Bostock-Smith, was produced and directed by Sydney Lotterby and was written by Bob Larbey, who had co-written both The Good Life and Ever Decreasing Circles with John Esmonde. In 2004, As Time Goes By was ranked No. 29 in Britain's Best Sitcom.

The series was produced by Theatre of Comedy Entertainment, in association with DLT Entertainment Ltd. for the BBC.

Cast

Main
Jean Mary Pargetter (later Hardcastle) (Judi Dench) – Judith's mother who later becomes Lionel's wife. Owner of a Secretarial Agency, "Type For You".
Lionel Hardcastle (Geoffrey Palmer) – Jean's husband and Rocky's son. Author of My Life in Kenya, and the Miniseries Just Two People.
Judith Hanson (later Deacon) (Moira Brooker) – Jean's daughter, and Sandy's best friend, later Alistair's wife. Works with Sandy.
Alistair Deacon (Philip Bretherton) – Initially publisher of Lionel's book, then Judith's husband.
Sandy (Jenny Funnell) – Jean's secretary and receptionist, Judith's best friend and later Harry's wife.

Recurring
Penny (Moyra Fraser) – Jean's annoying, self-absorbed sister-in-law (from Jean's first marriage to David).
Stephen (Paul Chapman) – Penny's entertainingly dull husband. He is a dentist and is smarter than he seems.
Richard "Rocky" Hardcastle (Frank Middlemass) – Lionel's irrepressible father who owns a country home in the Hampshire countryside, alongside a vast fortune. Marries Madge at 86 years old and together they travel around the world. He likes to say "Rock On", and they both love country music.
Madge Darbley-Hardcastle (Joan Sims) – Rocky Hardcastle's equally high-spirited wife, seven years his junior. Actress Joan Sims died in 2001, meaning she does not appear after series 7, although she continues to be mentioned.
Harry (David Michaels and Daniel Ryan) – Sandy's boyfriend and later her husband.
Mrs Bale (Janet Henfrey) – The Hardcastles' eccentric, very precise country home housekeeper. Interested in the shipping forecast, the weather and Australian Rules Football. She enjoys riding her motorbike and looking after the Hardcastles.
Lol Ferris (Tim Wylton) – The Hardcastles' amiable, decidedly rural gardener at their country home. Has six brothers who become interested in Sandy.
A continuing plot arc in series 3 and 4 had Lionel writing Just Two People, a mini-series for American television. Seen frequently during these series was American mini-series producer Mike Barbosa (Otto Jarman).
Also seen in series 3 and 4 were two secretaries Lionel had working for him as he dictated the Just Two People script. The first, whose presence concerned Jean, was the very competent and extremely attractive Daisy (Justine Glenton for her first appearance, thereafter Zoe Hilson). She was replaced by the kind-hearted but very talkative, and much older Gwen Flack (Vivienne Martin), whose presence irritates Lionel. Daisy later returns to replace Mrs Flack.

In the March 2011 PBS pledge drive programming special Behind the Britcoms: from Script to Screen hosted by cast members Moira Brooker and Philip Bretherton, the series creator/producer revealed that Jean Simmons had declined the first offer of the role of Jean (which was written with her in mind) due to her reluctance to uproot her life, specifically mentioning her dogs, garden, and family, in California.

Plot
Second Lieutenant Lionel Hardcastle and Middlesex Hospital nurse Jean Pargetter met in the summer of 1953 and fell head over heels in love, but then Lionel was posted to Korea. When he wrote to give her his mailing address there, the letter went astray. Jean assumed he had lost interest in her and stubbornly refused to ask the army to locate him; he decided she must have lost interest in him.

After his war service Lionel emigrated to Kenya, became a coffee planter, and married Margaret, whom he later divorced due to "mutual boredom". Some time after his divorce he returned to England. Meanwhile, Jean had also married and borne one child, Judith. After her husband's death, Jean opened Type for You, a secretarial agency. Her daughter Judith, 35 years old during the series, is twice divorced (from Ken, who had "sad eyes", and Edward, who was "very clever") and, during most of the series, lives with her mother and also works at the secretarial agency.

Lionel, now writing his memoir, My Life in Kenya, hires a typist through Type for You, unaware that Jean owns the agency. He and Jean first meet again when Lionel picks up Judith for a dinner date. Although Lionel and Jean's reunion is full of missteps and miscues, their romance gradually rekindles. In the third series, Lionel moves into Jean's house in Holland Park, London; they marry during the fourth series.

Lionel's memoir is published by Alistair Deacon, a go-getting entrepreneur much younger than Lionel. When pressed by Lionel, Alistair eventually admits that he only agreed to publish the book as a favour to Lionel's father, whose loan to Alistair's father was the foundation of Alistair's wealth; but he works hard for the success of the book and over time he becomes good friends with Lionel and Jean. Alistair is vain, and a ladies' man, and likes to call Lionel "Li", but he is also good-hearted and energetic, and proves resourceful enough to handle many situations that arise.

In the first series Judith develops a crush on Lionel while Alistair takes a similar interest in Jean and likes to call her "lovely lady". Both crushes are brief; eventually Judith and Alistair fall for each other and, in the final series, marry. Other story arcs feature Lionel being asked to write an American TV mini-series, Just Two People, based on his early romance with Jean. The mini-series fails after much rewriting and network interference. Jean eventually retires from Type for You and later volunteers at a charity shop.

Jean's very efficient secretary and Judith's best friend is Sandy, who eventually moves in with the Hardcastles after splitting with her boyfriend Nick. After Jean's retirement, Judy and Sandy become co-managers of Type for You. Sandy dates Harry, a policeman and amateur rugby player, whom she marries at the end of the series. Sandy's last name is never revealed on the show.

Other notable characters include Lionel's irrepressible father Rocky, whose favourite saying is "Rock on!" and who owns a large country house in Hampshire which he later gives to Lionel; Rocky's housekeeper, Mrs Bale, who has an unusual interest in the Shipping Forecast and gives exact times that meals will be ready; Rocky's gardener, Lol Ferris, who says Jean is a "tender woman"; and Lionel's glamorous young secretary Daisy, who firmly repels Alistair's clumsy efforts to chat her up every time they meet. In series 3 of the show, Lionel is told by Rocky's physician that his father has less than a year to live, but this plotline was dropped and Rocky continued to appear throughout the show's later series, including the final "Christmas Specials" in 2005.

Rocky marries Madge, as much a character as Rocky is, when he is 85 and she is 78 (Rocky features in the 2005 Christmas Special, where he must be around 97 years old). They travel the world, are country and western music fans, tool about in Madge's classic Cadillac convertible (with steer horns on the grille), and hang out at the local pub, where Madge sings. In series nine, Madge is mentioned as being on an archaeological dig in Egypt; in reality Joan Sims died before filming began. Also appearing many times are Penny, the meddling, neurotic sister of Jean's late first husband, who calls Jean "poor Jean", and Penny's well-meaning but dull dentist husband, Stephen, who once accidentally declined an OBE.

Episodes

The programme ran for ten series, from 12 January 1992 to 30 December 2005. All of the episodes were thirty minutes long with the exception of the final three episodes which were considerably longer. In December 2020, UKTV split the final two episodes which were also Christmas specials, into four shorter episodes. They added a 'next time on' and 'last time on' segment at the start and end of each episode.

International broadcasts
As Time Goes By has appeared in the United States on BBC America, and has been running weekly on PBS member stations almost continuously since the early 2000s, with various cast members appearing on its perennial pledge drives. It has run in Canada on BBC Canada and TVOntario, in Australia on ABC, 7TWO, 9Gem and Fox Classics, in New Zealand on both UKTV and SKY Network Television, in Finland on YLE TV1, and on DSTV in Nigeria. RTÉ One has broadcast the series in Ireland repeatedly. It has been broadcast by Gold for viewers in the UK and Ireland as of 2010, and by UKTV in Australia and the UK as of 2011. As of 2017, series 1-9 are available to stream through the BBC/ITV online digital video subscription service Britbox. Starting in 2022 the series is being shown on the UKTV channel Drama.

Radio
As Time Goes By was adapted and recorded for radio. Three series were broadcast on BBC Radio 2 between 1997 and 1999. The first episode included a flashback to Jean and Lionel 38 years before. All episodes correspond to a TV episode and featured the original cast, apart from Jon Glover substituting for Bretherton in episodes 1-5 of Series One. Only the first series was released on BBC audio cassette. Series One was repeated on BBC Radio 4 Extra from December 2014 to January 2015.

Home media
In Region 1 in North America the complete series has been released in individual sets and as a complete series from BBC Video. In the United Kingdom on Region 2, the series has been released several times; Universal Playback released the first four series on VHS and DVD format, with 2 Entertain acquiring the rights to release the remaining series on DVD, and additionally re-releasing the Series one to four and a complete collection on DVD. Cinema Club acquired the right to release the complete series over two sets, with the first containing Series One to Four and the following set containing Series Five to Nine. Acorn Media has released to 'The Reunion Specials' on DVD. In Australia on Region 4, the complete series has been released as individual sets and as a complete collection.

North America
Series 1 & 2 – released 17 September 2002 / re-released 30 August 2005 (2-disc set)
Series 3 – released 17 September 2002  / re-released 30 August 2005 (2-disc set)
Series 4 – released 2 April 2002 / re-released 30 August 2005 (2-disc set)
Series 5 – released 2002 / re-released 30 August 2005 (1-disc set)
Series 6 – released 2002 / re-released 30 August 2005 (1-disc set) 
Series 7 – released 2002 / re-released 30 August 2005 (1-disc set) 
Series 8 & 9 – released 2003 / re-released 30 August 2005 (2-disc set)
You Must Remember This – released 30 September 2003 / re-released 30 August 2005 (1-disc set)
The Reunion Specials – released 10 January 2006 (1-disc set)
Complete Original Series – released 30 August 2005 (11-disc set)

United Kingdom
Series 1 & 2 – released 17 March 2003 (3-VHS set / 3-DVD set distributed by Universal Playback)
Series 3 – released 25 October 2004 (3-VHS set / 3-DVD set distributed by Universal Playback)
Series 4 – released 21 February 2005 (1-VHS set / 1-DVD setdistributed by Universal Playback)
Series 1 – re-released 5 February 2007 (1-DVD set distributed by 2 Entertain)
Series 2 – re-released 5 February 2007 (1-DVD set distributed by 2 Entertain)
Series 3 – re-released 5 February 2007 (2 DVD set distributed by 2 Entertain)
Series 4 – re-released 5 February 2007 (2-DVD set distributed by 2 Entertain)
Series 5 – released 24 October 2005 (1-DVD set distributed by 2 Entertain)
Series 6 – released 20 January 2006 (1-DVD set distributed by 2 Entertain)
Series 7 – released 20 March 2006 (1 DVD set distributed by 2 Entertain)
Series 8 – released 22 May 2006 (1 DVD set distributed by 2 Entertain)
Series 9 – released 21 August 2006 (1 DVD set distributed by 2 Entertain)
The Complete Series 1–4 – released 11 September 2006 (6-DVD set distributed by Cinema Club)
The Complete Series 5–9 – released 2 October 2006 (5-DVD set distributed by Cinema Club) 
The Reunion Specials – released 16 July 2012 (1-DVD set distributed by Acorn Media)
Complete Series 1–9 – released 2 November 2015 (11-DVD set distributed by 2 Entertain)

Australia
As Time Goes By – Series 1 and 2 (2 Disc Set) – 5 May 2003
As Time Goes By – Series 3 and 4 (3 Disc Set) – 10 November 2004
As Time Goes By – Series 5 and 6 (2 Disc Set) – 7 April 2005
As Time Goes By – Series 7 and 8 (2 Disc Set) – 6 October 2005
As Time Goes By – Series 9–9 August 2004
As Time Goes By – The Reunion Specials, Part 1 – 1 October 2005
As Time Goes By – The Reunion Specials, Part 2 – 4 May 2006
As Time Goes By – The Reunion Specials, Parts 1 & 2 – 30 November 2006
As Time Goes By – Series 1–9: Collectors Edition (11 Disc Box Set) – 6 October 2006, Re-Release 1 September 2011
As Time Goes By – Series 1–9: Remastered Collectors Edition (11 Disc Box Set) – 6 October 2006, Re-Release 1 September 2019

References

External links
As Time Goes By at bbc.co.uk

As Times Goes By at British Comedy (with radio episode guide)

1992 British television series debuts
2005 British television series endings
1990s British romantic comedy television series
1990s British sitcoms
2000s British romantic comedy television series
2000s British sitcoms
BBC romance television shows
BBC television sitcoms
English-language television shows
Television series about couples
Television shows set in Hampshire
Television shows set in London